Florian Côté (17 May 1929 – 29 January 2002) was a Liberal party
member of the House of Commons of Canada. He was born in Sainte-Brigitte-des-Saults, Quebec and became a farmer by career.

He was first elected at the Nicolet—Yamaska riding in a 19 September 1966 by-election. In the next federal election in 1968, he was elected at Richelieu, and re-elected two more times there in the 1972 and 1974 federal elections. Côté left federal politics after completing his term in the 30th Canadian Parliament.

External links
 
  SorelTracyRegion.net: "Décès de l'ancien député fédéral Florian Côté" (obituary, 5 February 2002)

1929 births
2002 deaths
Canadian farmers
Members of the House of Commons of Canada from Quebec
Liberal Party of Canada MPs